Yilin Zhong is a British Chinese journalist, screenwriter and author. She is the author of seventeen novels, two film screenplays, ten books and many other work including poems and literary reviews. She now lives in London.

Early life 

Yilin Zhong was born in China. Her father was a literary editor at the China Federation of Literary and Art Union in Beijing but was exiled to southwest China as miner during the Cultural Revolution. Zhong wrote her first poem at five which was published when she was seven, and her first short story was published at the age of twelve in Shanghai Youth Literature. At thirteen, she wrote a research thesis 'Who broke up the wood-stone engagement?' and it was released in the academic journal A Dream of Red Mansions Journal in 1993.

At fourteen, Zhong wrote her first full-length novel Embracing the Sun, which was not published. Her second novel Sunshine and the Monsoon, written at sixteen, was published in 1995 and won her national reputation as the youngest talented writer; Zhong was interviewed by China Central Television's Book Review. In 1992, Zhong received an award voted by national readers for a short story released in Shanghai Youth Literature as the "Best Work of The Year".

At the age of sixteen, Zhong was offered by three top art universities in China. She decided to go to the Central Academy of Drama and studied Drama Literature and Play Writing, while she also passed the exam for the Theatre Director Department.

Education 
Zhong studied at the Central Academy of Drama in Beijing, China, and achieved a distinction BA degree in Drama Literature and Playwriting.

In 2002, Zhong came to the UK and achieved her MA degree in Cultural Studies from the University of Warwick. Afterward she immigrated to the UK and has been living in London.

Career 

Yilin Zhong started her creative literary writing when she was five. In 1995, she published her first novel Sunshine and the Monsoon. In 1996 she was interviewed by the China Central TV Station's Book Review program as its youngest writer interviewed, and was called 'hugely successful and notable'. From 1995 to 2002, while Zhong was in Beijing, she worked for Beijing TV station, Beijing Broadcasting station and various magazines and newspapers, published five books, including three novels, one essays and one short stories collection. Meanwhile, she also became a successful journalist and received a National Award for her exceptional contribution on reporting the IT technology blooming in China. Zhong wrote a film script 'Sunshine and the Monsoon' (adapted from her own novel) at the age of nineteen and won the Excellence Award for Chinese Youth Film Script in 1996. Her translation work 'In a Station of the Metro'(Ezra Pound) was collected into Chinese national high school's Literature Textbook and Chinese universities' textbook for American Literature. Her letter to editor was published in 'One person's Literary History'(by Cheng Yongxin, Editor-in-chief of Harvest Literary Magazine) as one of writers' documentaries in contemporary Chinese literature. Before coming to the UK, Zhong was one of notable contemporary women writers in China, and belonged to the 'Post 70s Generation' writers.

After immigrating to the UK in 2002, Zhong has been living in London anonymously and continued writing fiction and essays in Chinese. London Single Diary(2009) was her first series written in the UK and published in China; the twin work London Love Story was published in 2010 and ranked at #3 on Amazon bestselling fiction list. Her novel Chinatown (written in 2005 in London) was released in 'Harvest' in 2011, which gathered American Chinese writer Ha Jin, British Chinese writer Yilin Zhong, and Taiwanese writer Qi Bang Yuan's works as a 'Special Issue of Oversea-Chinese Writers', sold out in three months. Zhong attended the London Book Fair in 2012 and met many Beijing writer friends, such as the Vice Editor-in-chief of People's Literature and Pathlight magazines, recalled their friendship in Beijing in his published London Diaries. Zhong also wrote London theater reviews for newspapers and National Drama Study, and was cited by Shakespeare beyond English published in the UK. In 2013, her novel Personal Statement(written in 2000 at Beijing) was published in Shanghai.

In 2013, Zhong joint a reality dating TV show of Channel 4 and appeared on First Dates as herself. This was her first public appearance in the UK and she became the TV advertising model in its first season. In 2014, Harvest published the Kindle version of Chinatown; then the paperback edition was published in 2015, and was appraised to have filled the 'remarkable blank space of illegal immigration in contemporary Chinese literature history' (Editor's Review). In March 2015, Yilin Zhong had her first interview since 2002 with Harvest literary magazine for her new book Chinatown, and the interviewer recommended that 'one of this literary work's very great significance', is that 'it has changed our understanding of the world'.

In 2015, Zhong took a trip to New York, and then began to write her first novel in English: Dear New York,(1-4); Book 1-3 were written between Dec 2015 and March 2016 in London and Book 4 was completed in May 2016 in New York. She also sketched a new fiction Miss China and a non-fiction Folks of New York at Manhattan, and then wrote her first collection of poems in English after coming back to London in the fall of 2016. In October 2017, Zhong wrote her latest fiction The Private Scene as the third book of the personal statement trilogy, which was a derivative work of the second book of the trilogy, In London. The novel In London was written in 2005 in London and was published in February 2018 in China, having an unpublished foreword written by Wenfen Chen-Malmqvist, plus a few thousand words relating to political events were deleted due to the publishing censorship in China. In 2017-18, Zhong wrote her column The London Scene for Southern Weekend newspaper, her first column in Chinese media. Up until 2021, Zhong has published ten books including eight novels, all sold out.

Speech Ban 

On 6 February 2020, right after the death of Dr. Li Wenliang, one of the covid-19 'eight gentlemen' in Wuhan, Yilin Zhong posted a Weibo to question Dr. Li's death in suspicious, suspecting that he was not naturally dead but was killed by some Wuhan malfeasance officers in order to destroy evidence of their malfeasance during the Coronavirus spreading from December 2019 to January 2020. Her post was immediately deleted by Sina Weibo and she was forbidden to post for one week. Then she was scolded by a large number of Chinese official media, together with CNN who also suspiciously questioned about Dr. Li Wenliang's death. One week later, on 14 February, the day of being 'allowed' to speak, Yilin Zhong at once published a 5,000-word inference article 'Li Wenliang's Life and Death Line' on her Weibo account with the cached photo, analyzing Dr. Li Wenliang's life line from the day he was infected and separately hospitalized for 21 days until he was finally diagnosed, to when he was officially 'declared' to have died after 26 days of hospitalization. She was immediately banned to speak on Weibo again and her Weibo account with 78,500 followers was then closed for a year. On 13 February, right after the Chinese central government removed two Party Committee Secretaries in Hubei, Yilin Zhong found the broadband at her London home was suddenly cut off by the hacker. 

In April 2020, when Yilin Zhong was interviewed by Jiemian News in China, she reviewed the Covid-19 issue since 6th Feb up to April and criticized a series of erroneous decisions by Hubei government, including concealing the epidemic figures, delaying Li Wenliang ’s treatment and leading to his death, etc. However, because of the sensitive content, the news article only limitedly reported a few points she made, so she had to post her full speech content on Youtube. Then almost at the same time when Wuhan writer Fang Fang has published her 'Wuhan Diary' in both USA and Germany, Amazon.com sent Yilin Zhong an official notification notifying her that they had closed her KDP author's account and had removed all her books from the Kindle Store, despite the fact that all her Kindle books are fiction works and were published via KDP more than three years ago. On 6 December 2021, a few months after Zhong's Weibo account was recovered from the one year ban, Weibo has officially announced to have permanently closed Yilin Zhong's Weibo account with 83,808 fans and all contents became invisible, due to her 'harmful speech' regarding Covid-19 and other political reviews. On 7 December, Zhong's Wechat official account 'Yilin Zhong in London' was also closed down with all her articles were deleted, which means now she was banned from the public sight in China.

Bibliography

Novel 
 Sunshine and the monsoon 《阳光雨季》(Novel, January 1995)
 Say love 《言情》(Novel, September 1998)
 A love Fiction 《非一般爱情小说》(Novel, September 2001)
 London Single Diary 《伦敦单身日记》(Novel, August 2009)
 London Love Story 《伦敦爱情故事》(Novel, May 2010)
 Personal Statement 《北京北京》（原名《个人现状》）(Novel, June 2013)
 Chinatown (2015 novel) 《唐人街》(Novel, January 2015)
 In London (2018 novel) 《在伦敦》（原名《文本生活》）(Novel, February 2018)
London Single Lady Series《伦敦单身女郎》系列 (Fiction, Season 1-5) 
 S1. The Mayfair Affair 《伦敦恋爱物语》(Novel)
 S2.London Map of Romance 《伦敦爱情地图》(Novel)
 S3.London Single Lady 《伦敦单身女郎》(Novel)
 S4.Single Girl's Diary 《单身女郎日记》(Novel)
 S4 extra. A 36 Hours' Film 《一场36小时的电影》(Novella)
 S5.London Single Fairytale 《伦敦单身童话》(Novel)

Essays and short stories 
 Eyes in Subway 《地铁里的眼睛》(Essay collection, January 2001)
 Going to Tibet 《去往拉萨》(Short Story collection, January 2005)
 London Single Diary 《伦敦单身日记》系列(season 1-4)

Other works 
 The Postmodern Life 《后现代生活》(Novel)
 Postmodernism and the Third World 《后现代主义与第三世界研究》(Research Essay, in English)
 Sunshine and the Monsoon 《阳光雨季》电影剧本(Film Screenplay, Winner of Excellence Award for Chinese Youth film script in 1996)
 London Love Story 《伦敦爱情故事》电影剧本(Film Screenplay, adapted from the published novel)
 Dear New York, (Book 1-4, Novel, in English)
 Poems Written in London (Poetry Collection, in English)
 The Private Scene (Novel)
 The London Scene (Collection of short stories)

References

Further reading 

  《BBC人物特写：在伦敦寻找爱情的华人女作家钟宜霖》|BBC|2015-8-4 BBC People: Chinese Writer Yilin Zhong in London|BBC|4 August 2015 - Google translation 
 Chinatown's Invisible Residents 英文报道：《唐人街看不见的居民》|Shanghai Daily|2015-8-30
  對話: 從《唐人街》的眾生百態看現世中文學的價值|《收穫》|2015-3-1 Dialogue: Exploring the value of literature in contemporary time through characters' various lives in 'Chinatown'|Harvest|March 2015-Google translation
  《唐人街》新書介紹及第一章試讀|《收穫》|2015-3-1 The first chapter of 'Chinatown' and introduction|Harvest|March 2015-Google translation
  《海外華人駁雜生活的浮世繪》|書評|《中國出版傳媒商報》|2015-3-3  Ukiyo-e of the heterogeneous overseas Chinese living|Book Review|China Publishing News|3 March 2015-Google Translation
  《活在想像中的後現代中國人》|《唐人街》新書推薦及書評|《中國作家》網|2015-3-2 The Postmodern Chinese living in their imagination/Book Review and 'Chinatown' Introduction|Chinese Writer Net|2 March 2015-Google translation
  《唐人街，一個想像中的中國社會》-出版後記|《收穫》|2015-3-1Chinatown, an imaginary community-publishing postscript|Harvest|March 2015-Google translation
  《作者已死：解讀<唐人街>的一種方式》|江蘇文藝出版社|V新聞|2015-3-8Death of the Author: A method to interpret 'Chinatown'|8 March 2015-Google translation
 'Say Love' book review: 像鍾鯤一樣尖叫:讀鍾鯤之《言情》|葉滿城|網易博客|2005-9-26|Screaming as Zhongkun-Reading 'Say Love'|Ye Mancheng|NetEase blog|26 Sep 2005
 'A Love Fiction' book review: 普遍的焦慮：回憶和失憶|周冰心|網易報導|2001-12-30|A general anxiety: memories and amnesia|Zhou Bingxin|NetEase report|30 December 2001
 'A Love Fiction' book review: 一條叫鍾鯤的魚|李基濱|網易報導|2002-1-7|A fish named Zhongkun|Lee Jibin|NetEase report|7 Jan 2002  
 Yilin Zhong's audio book recommendation for The Beijing News: Leaf Storm by Gabriel García Márquez 名家薦書•鍾宜霖：馬爾克斯《枯枝敗葉》(音頻)|《新京報書評周刊》|2013-8-10
 Yilin Zhong's audio record for her book 'Personal Statement' for The Beijing News: 作者薦書•鍾宜霖：《北京，北京》(音頻)|《新京報書評周刊》|2013-8-9
 Yilin Zhong's audio interview clip for radio broadcasting program: 鍾宜霖的聲音名片(音頻)|電台訪談節目|會客長安|2013-7-31
 Yilin Zhong's one-hour interview record for radio broadcasting program: 鍾宜霖新書《北京北京》電台採訪直播節目錄音（完整版）|電台訪談節目|會客長安|2013-7-31
 A piece of 'London Single Diary'-Google translation:  Waking up in the morning of London(Diary: 27 June); War, Pestilence and Love (Diary: 9 April)
 Yilin Zhong's criticism on governors on Kunming tragedy: http://m.guancha.cn/FaZhi/2014_03_02_210038
  钟宜霖专栏：《伦敦场景》|《南方周末》|2017-11-8
  《收获》微信专稿•访谈：从长篇小说《唐人街》看海外非法华人移民的现状（三万字深度访谈完整版-上）|《收获》|2015-6-6 Harvest exclusive special interview: Exploring Status of Overseas Illegal Chinese Immigrants from Novel 'Chinatown'(Part 1)|Harvest Literary Magazine|June 2015 - Google translation  
  《收获》微信专稿•访谈：从长篇小说《唐人街》看海外非法华人移民的现状（三万字深度访谈完整版-下）|《收获》|2015-6-6 Harvest exclusive special interview: Exploring Status of Overseas Illegal Chinese Immigrants from Novel 'Chinatown'(Part 2)|Harvest Literary Magazine|June 2015 - Google translation 
  《唐人街：后殖民语境中的"他者"》|《青春》文学杂志|2015-5-1 Chinatown:the "Other" under the Post-colonial Context|Youth Literary Magazine|May 2015 - Google translation 
  《访谈︱唐人街是想象中的中国社会》|澎湃新聞|2015-4-8 Interview: Chinatown is an imaginary community|The Paper|8 April 2015-Google translation
  《唐人街》:在孤岛中找寻归属|新商报书评坊|2015-5-23 Chinatwon: looking for their belonging in an isolated island|Xinshang Daily|23 May 2015 - Google translation
  Other media reports: (1)《唐人街》:一幅複雜而鮮明的浮世繪|新浪讀書|2015-3-10 (2)鍾宜霖：《唐人街》，在倫敦的中國人|鳳凰網|2015-3-11 (3)《唐人街》：走近生活在倫敦社會邊緣的中國人|搜狐讀書頻道|2015-3-13 (4)唐人街，在倫敦的中國人|《揚子晚報》|網易新聞|2015-3-18 (5)唐人街：一條街上一生戲，生死離合皆文章|江蘇文藝出版社|V新聞|2015-3-8 (6)《唐人街》出版|中國文化傳媒網|2015-3-11 (7)從《唐人街》的眾生百態看現世中文學的價值|浙江作家網|2015-3-3 (8)《唐人街:在倫敦的中國人》|共識網|2015-3-13 (9)活在舊時代的後現代中國人|東北作家網|2015-3-9 (10)鍾宜霖《唐人街》出版，關注倫敦的中國人|書香重慶|2015-3-11 (11) 《唐人街》：為"不存在"者素描|中國江蘇網|2015-3-12 (12)一幅複雜而鮮明的浮世繪|光明網|2015-3-12 (13)蘭州日報|蘭州新聞網|2015-3-12 (14) 鍾宜霖《唐人街》出版|吉林日報|2015-3-11 (15)龍崗網|2015-3-11 (16)FLK.cc|2015-3-10(17) 漢豐網|2015-3-12 (18)東北網|2015-3-12 (19)《唐人街》:一幅複雜而鮮明的浮世繪|《愛尚生活》雜誌|2015-3-11 (20) 廣州日報|2015-3-20 (21)汕頭都市報|2015-3-15 (22)新書速遞:《唐人街》|石家莊日報|2015-3-23  (23)家國網|2015-3-12 (24)書情:《唐人街》|鳳凰資訊|2015-3-20 (25)書情:《唐人街》|新浪娛樂|2015-3-20 (26)書情:《唐人街》|和訊網|2015-3-20 (27)書情|娛樂星報|新浪台灣|2015-3-20 (28)鳳凰江蘇人氣書榜TOP5:《唐人街》|2015-3-16 (29)唐人街，在倫敦的中國人|《揚子晚報》|2015-3-18(30)《唐人街》為"不存在"者素描|深圳晚報|2015-4-5 (31)2015年度中国影响力图书推展|《中国出版传媒商报》|2015-3-25 (32)2015年度中国影响力图书推展·第壹季·小说类TOP20|中国出版传媒商报|2015-3-24(33)唐人街的黑户如何生存|腾讯文化|2015-4-9(34)写给残酷世界的100条微博（微博名人版）|《新周刊》|第324期(35)在伦敦寻找爱情的华人女作家|《侨声报》|2015-8-4(36)旅英华人女作家钟宜霖：在伦敦寻找爱情|中国侨网|2015-8-6(37)华人女作家钟宜霖|海外网|2015-8-6(38)在伦敦寻找爱情|多联网|2015-8-6(39）钟宜霖长篇小说《唐人街》|长征网|2015-3-17(40)在倫敦尋找愛情的華人女作家鐘宜霖|明鏡網|2015-8-5(41)在伦敦寻找爱情|BBC中文網（繁體）|2015-8-9(42)《唐人街》中的价值观差异|凤凰网|2015-3-26(43)旅英华人女作家钟宜霖|《欧洲时报》|2015-8-5(44)从序列时间到轮回时间－论《唐人街》的小说结构|党霄羽|《世界华文文学论坛》|2015-12-1(45)《唐人街》：后殖民语境中的他者|李骄阳|《青春》文学杂志|中国论文网|2015-6-9

External links 
 
 

Living people
Post 70s Generation
Alumni of the University of Warwick
20th-century British women writers
21st-century British women writers
Postmodern writers
20th-century Chinese women writers
20th-century Chinese writers
21st-century Chinese women writers
21st-century Chinese writers
British writers of Chinese descent
Central Academy of Drama alumni
Year of birth missing (living people)